The men's K-4 500 metres sprint canoeing event at the 2020 Summer Olympics took place on 6 and 7 August 2021 at the Sea Forest Waterway. 44 canoeists (11 boats of 4) from 11 nations competed.

Background
This was the debut appearance of the event, replacing the 1000 metres men's K-4 race that was held from 1964 to 2016.

The reigning World Champions were Tom Liebscher, Ronald Rauhe, Max Rendschmidt, and Max Lemke of Germany, who were named to the German team. The 2016 Olympic champions in the 1000 metres were Rendschmidt, Liebscher, Max Hoff, and Marcus Gross; Hoff has also been named to the German team.

Qualification

A National Olympic Committee (NOC) could qualify one place in the event. A total of 10 qualification places were available, all awarded through the 2019 ICF Canoe Sprint World Championships. There were required to be boats from 4 different continents qualified. Thus, the top 7 at the World Championships were guaranteed to qualify, with the 8th, 9th, and 10th spots potentially being reserved for continental qualifiers.

Qualifying places were awarded to the NOC, not to the individual canoeist who earned the place.

The World Championships places were allocated as follows:

Competition format
Sprint canoeing uses a three-round format for events with 10 boats, with heats, semifinals, and finals. The specifics of the progression format depend on the number of boats ultimately entered.

 Heats: 2 heats of 5 boats each. The top 2 in each heat (4 boats total) advance directly to the final. The remaining 6 boats compete in the semifinal.
 Semifinal: 1 heat of 6 boats. The top 4 advance to the final; the remaining 2 boats are eliminated in 9th and 10th place.
 Final: 1 heat of 8 boats. The medals and 4th through 8th place are awarded.

The course is a flatwater course 9 metres wide. The name of the event describes the particular format within sprint canoeing. The "K" format means a kayak, with the canoeist sitting, using a double-bladed paddle to paddle, and steering with a foot-operated rudder (as opposed to a canoe, with a kneeling canoeist, single-bladed paddle, and no rudder). The "4" is the number of canoeists in each boat. The "500 metres" is the distance of each race.

Schedule
The event was held over two consecutive days, with two rounds per day. All sessions started at 9:30 a.m. local time, though there are multiple events with races in each session.

Canoer per team

Results

Heats
Progression System: 1st-2nd to SF, rest to QF.

Heat 1

Heat 2

Quarterfinal
Progression System: 1st-6th to SF, rest out

Semifinals
Progression System: 1st-4th to Final, rest out.

Semifinal 1

Semifinal 2

Final

References

Men's K-4 500 metres
Men's events at the 2020 Summer Olympics